Live from Oz is a live album by instrumental rock/progressive metal supergroup Planet X, released in 2002 through Inside Out Music.

Critical reception

François Couture at AllMusic gave Live from Oz three stars out of five, saying that it "packs tons of energy" and praising each musician for their virtuosity.

Track listing

Personnel
Tony MacAlpine – guitar, production
Derek Sherinian – keyboard, production
Virgil Donati – drums, production
Dave LaRue – bass
Albert Law – engineering
Simon Phillips – mixing
Brad Vance – mastering

Release history

References

External links
In Review: Planet X "Live From Oz" at Guitar Nine Records

Planet X (band) albums
2002 live albums
Inside Out Music live albums